Margus is an Estonian masculine given name, a variant of Marcus.

People named Margus include:
Margus Allikmaa (born 1961), theatre diector, cultural figure and politician
Margus Hanson (born 1958), politician
Margus Hernits (born 1972), figure skater
Margus Hunt (born 1987), shot putter, discus and hammer thrower
Margus Kolga (born 1966), diplomat
Margus Konnula  (aka Contra; born 1974), poet and translator
Margus Kuul (born 1979), military commander
Margus Laidre (born 1959), historian and diplomat
Margus Leivo (1954–2019), politician 
Margus Lepa (born 1953), radio journalist, comedian and actor
Margus Lepik (born 1969), politician
Margus Luik (born 1980), racewalker
Margus Metstak (born 1961), basketball player
Margus Oopkaup (born 1959), actor
Margus Pirksaar (born 1974), runner
Margus Põldsepp (born 1969), musician (Lõõtsavägilased)
Margus Prangel (born 1974), actor 
Margus Saar (born 1966), television journalist and producer
Margus Tabor (born 1962), actor 
Margus Tammekivi (born 1956), lawyer, politician and sports figure
Margus Tsahkna (born 1977), politician

References

Estonian masculine given names

de:Margus
it:Margus